Sherine Yvonne Abeyratne is an Australian singer.  She and her identical twin sister, Suzanne "Zan", were born in 1961 in London, and raised in Australia.  They often sang together as backing singers of a number of groups including Models, INXS and U2.  Their Sri Lankan-born parents also have two sons; their mother entertained her children by playing piano and with her dancing, while their father shared his admiration of Louis Armstrong and jazz music. After moving from London family lived in Sri Lanka for "several years" before migrating to Australia. Both sisters became vocalists in bands both together, and separately, from 1978. They were members of Grand Wazoo, Sherine left to become a backing vocalist for Jo Jo Zep and then INXS, while Zan became a member of Bang. Sherine provided lead vocals for Big Pig from 1985 to 1991.

Sherine was also associated with Grand Wazoo Band of 1000 Dances, The Editions (1980–84), Bang, Big Choir, Bob Starkie Shape Up, Gospel Truth, Jo Jo Zep, Black Coffee, Dianna Boss and The Extremes, The Rock Party, Mercy Mercy (1991), Sherine, and Sherine's X Machine.

References

General
  Note: Archived [on-line] copy has limited functionality.

Small photo of Big Pig from Artist Direct

Specific
 

Australian women singers
Australian dance musicians
Living people
1961 births
Australian people of Sri Lankan descent